Hochgrat is a 1834 m high summit of the Allgäu Alps, highest mountain of the Nagelfluhkette (group of mountains consisting of conglomerate) and part of nature park Nagelfluhkette.

External links 
 
 Staufner Haus of German Alpine Club Oberstaufen-Lindenberg
 German Alpine Club Oberstaufen-Lindenberg
 Hochgrat cable car (with webcam)
 360° Panorama view of Hochgrat

Mountains of Bavaria
Allgäu Alps
Mountains of the Alps